Christopher John Kitching CBE (born 5 August 1945) is a British archivist who served as Secretary of the Royal Commission on Historical Manuscripts (now part of The National Archives) from 1992 to 2004.

Career
Kitching completed a BA in Modern History at Durham University in 1967, followed by a PhD from the same institution in 1970. He was awarded the Alexander Prize from the Royal Historical Society in 1973. He began his career as an Assistant Keeper at the Public Record Office (PRO), where he worked until 1982, before joining the Royal Commission on Historical Manuscripts (HMC) as Assistant Secretary. He served in this role until 1992, when he became Secretary in succession to Brian Smith. 

In April 2003, the HMC merged with the PRO to form The National Archives: Kitching moved to the new institution before retiring a year later.

Publications
(ed.) 

(ed.) 

(ed.; with Michael Roper)

References 

Living people
1945 births
People associated with The National Archives (United Kingdom)
Alumni of University College, Durham
English archivists